Dulmial is a town and union council, an administrative subdivision, of Chakwal District in the Punjab Province of Pakistan. It is part of Choa Saidan Shah Tehsil and has a population of almost 30,000. Dulmial is known within Pakistan as the "village with the gun".

Location
Dulmial is a village approximately 150 kilometres south of Islamabad in Pakistan. It is located on the road starting from Choa Saidan Shah to Kallar Kahar near the scenic Hindu monument The KatasRaj Temple.

History
Dulmial is known as the "village with the gun" and the "Home Town of Gunners". Since its foundation some eight centuries ago, the village has provided the largest number of army men to the state.

Dulmial village sent 460 soldiers to the British forces in World War I, the largest participation of any village in South Asia nine died. The village sent 732 soldiers to World War II. 

A memorial stone was built in honour of the 460 soldiers on the premises of a primary school . In 1925, the British government presented Dulmial with a cannon in recognition of its World War I contributions; the award, chosen by a village representative, was transported from Jhelum first by train and then in a cart drawn by oxen. It was mounted at the entrance to the village with a plaque, and as a result Dulmial is known in Pakistan as "the village with the gun".

It was predominantly a Muslim village before the Partition Of India. After the Partition, it became part of Pakistan.

After the creation of Pakistan, Dulmial provided five lieutenant-generals and 23 brigadiers along with many other junior officers to the army.

Gallery

References

Union councils of Chakwal District
Populated places in Chakwal District